Fun generally refers to recreation or entertainment.

Fun may also refer to:

Arts, entertainment, and media

Music
 Fun (band), an American indie pop band

Albums
 Fun (Daniel Johnston album), 1994
 Fun (Garth Brooks album), 2020
 Fun?, a 1993 album by the Candyskins

Songs
 "Fun" (Da Mob song), 1998
 "Fun" (Coldplay song), 2015
 "Fun" (Pitbull song), 2015
 "Fun" (Xu Weizhou song), 2016
 "Fun" (Blondie song), 2017
 "Fun" (Selena Gomez song), 2020
 "Fun", a 2003 song by Smash Mouth from the album Get the Picture?
 "F.U.N. Fun Fanaa", a 2011 song by Ali Zafar
 "Ffun", a 1977 song by Con Funk Shun

Other uses in arts, entertainment, and media
 "F.U.N." (SpongeBob SquarePants), an episode
 Fun Channel, a Middle Eastern TV channel
 Fun (film), 1994
 Fun (magazine), 1861-1901
 Fun Radio (disambiguation)
 Little Miss Fun, in the Little Miss books

Brands and enterprises
 Cedar Fair, stock symbol FUN, an American amusement park operator that owns:
Oceans of Fun, in Kansas City, Missouri
 Worlds of Fun and its onsite resort, Worlds of Fun Village, in Kansas City, Missouri
 Fun Cinemas, a cinema chain in India
 Fun Publications, an American comic book publisher
 FUN Technologies, an online game company

Transportation
 Air Creation Fun, a series of ultralight aircraft
 Airborne Fun, a series of hang gliders
 Fun 23, a French sailboat design
 Funafuti International Airport, in Tuvalu

Other uses
 Field with one element (Fun)
 Fulniô language
 Function (computer science)
 France Université Numérique, an MOOC provider
 Proposed denomination of Japanese Meiji period coinage

See also
Faun (disambiguation)
Fawn (disambiguation)
Fon (disambiguation)